is a Japanese weightlifter. Oshiro represented Japan at the 2008 Summer Olympics in Beijing, where she competed for the women's flyweight category (48 kg), along with her compatriot Hiromi Miyake. Oshiro placed eighth in this event, as she successfully lifted 80 kg in the single-motion snatch, and hoisted 92 kg in the two-part, shoulder-to-overhead clean and jerk, for a total of 172 kg.

References

External links
NBC 2008 Olympics profile

1984 births
Living people
Olympic weightlifters of Japan
Weightlifters at the 2008 Summer Olympics
People from Naha
Japanese female weightlifters
21st-century Japanese women